Robert Bouten (born 8 November 1984 in Oss) is a Dutch slalom canoer who has competed since the early 2000s. He finished ninth in the K-1 event at the 2008 Summer Olympics in Beijing.

References
Sports-Reference.com profile

1984 births
Canoeists at the 2008 Summer Olympics
Dutch male canoeists
Living people
Olympic canoeists of the Netherlands
Sportspeople from Oss
21st-century Dutch people